John Tinline Harkness (6 April 1867 – 15 December 1960) was a New Zealand cricketer.

Playing career
He played first-class cricket for Auckland and Otago between 1892 and 1901. Harkness was educated at Nelson College from 1880 to 1883.

See also
 List of Otago representative cricketers
 List of Auckland representative cricketers

References

External links
 

1867 births
1960 deaths
New Zealand cricketers
Auckland cricketers
Otago cricketers
People from Richmond, New Zealand
People educated at Nelson College